Lyell Canyon is a sub-alpine meadow in Yosemite National Park south of Tuolumne Meadows. The valley at the base is relatively flat and wide, following the Lyell Fork of the Tuolumne River through an open meadow and wooded areas. The Lyell Fork eventually meets with Tuolumne River.

The canyon as well as Mount Lyell to the west is named after Charles Lyell, a well-known 19th century geologist and friend of Charles Darwin.

The canyon is an easy hike from Tuolumne Meadows campground. The John Muir Trail and the Pacific Crest Trail both route through the canyon. The trail is popular for hikers as an easy way to view surrounding mountains, a waterfall and Sierra wildflowers.

External links 
 Yosemite Hikes

See also

 Lyell Meadow
 Mount Lyell

References

Landforms of Yosemite National Park
Landforms of Tuolumne County, California
Canyons and gorges of the United States